Cyaphide, P≡C−, is the phosphorus analogue of cyanide. It is not known as a discrete salt, however In silico measurements reveal that the −1 charge in this ion is located mainly on carbon (0.65), as opposed to phosphorus.

Preparation
Organometallic complexes of cyaphide were first reported in 1992.  More recent preparations use two other routes:

From SiR3-functionalised phosphaalkynes
Treatment of the η1-coordinated phosphaalkyne complex trans– with an alkoxide resulted in desilylation, followed by subsequent rearrangement to the corresponding carbon-bound cyaphide complex.  Cyaphide-alkynyl complexes are prepared similarly.

From 2-phosphaethynolate anion (−OC≡P)
An actinide cyaphide complex can be prepared by C−O bond cleavage of the phosphaethynolate anion, the phosphorus analogue of cyanate. Reaction of the uranium complex [] with [ in the presence of 2.2.2-cryptand results in the formation of a dinuclear, oxo-bridged uranium complex featuring a C≡P ligand.

See also
 phosphaalkyne (P≡CH)
 Methylidynephosphane

References 

Anions